Kids Aflame is the debut album by American indie band ARMS. It was released on 9 June 2008 by Melodic Records in the United Kingdom and on 27 October 2009 by Gigantic Music in the United States.

Critical reception

Kids Aflame received generally favorable reviews; aggregating website Metacritic reports an average score of 74 out of 100, based on 6 reviews.

Track listing

References

External links
 Kids Aflame at Discogs
 

2008 albums